

The Viberti Musca 1 is a 1940s Italian two-seat civil touring monoplane produced by Ali Verberti SpA of Turin.

The Musca 1 was a cantilever low-wing monoplane powered by an  Continental C85 flat-four piston engine. Named for the chief designer Franco Muscariello it had an enclosed side-by-side seating and a fixed conventional landing gear. The Musca 1 started production in 1948 and in 1951 the Musca 1bis was introduced with structural improvements. The company had two further variants planned but the company was dissolved around 1951. Muscareillo continued development of the Musca 1, however, flying a modified version, the Musca 1 Ter powered by a Walter Micron on 15 September 1952.

Variants
Musca 1
Initial production variant.
Musca 1bis
Structural improvements.
Musca 1 Ter
Modified undercarriage and  Walter Micron III engine.
Musca 2
Three-seat cabin monoplane, not built.
Musca 4
A high-wing development of the Musca 1, not built.

Specifications

References

Notes

Bibliography

1940s Italian civil utility aircraft
Low-wing aircraft
Aircraft first flown in 1948